Vršce is a municipality and village in Jičín District in the Hradec Králové Region of the Czech Republic. It has about 200 inhabitants.

History
The first written mention of Vršce is from 1247.

References

Villages in Jičín District